Euphorbia pachypodioides is a species of plant in the family Euphorbiaceae. It is endemic to Madagascar.  Its natural habitat is rocky areas. It is threatened by habitat loss.  It also has the binomial synonym Euphorbia antankara (Leandri, 1946).

This small plant is available from several sources for enthusiasts.  It is attractive, but slow growing.

References

Endemic flora of Madagascar
pachypodioides
Critically endangered plants
Taxonomy articles created by Polbot